The Factory and Workshop Act 1895 was a UK Act of Parliament intended to regulate the conditions, safety, health and wages of people working in factories. It gives an example of the serious problems in UK labour law at the beginning of the 20th century.

See also

History of labour law
UK labour law
UK labour law history

Notes

United Kingdom labour law
Legal history of the United Kingdom
United Kingdom Acts of Parliament 1895
Health and safety in the United Kingdom
Occupational safety and health law
1895 in labor relations